Sargassopsis is a genus of brown algae belonging to the family Sargassaceae.

The species of this genus are found in Australia.

Species:
 Sargassopsis decurrens (R.Brown ex Turner) Trevisan, 1843

References

Fucales
Fucales genera